Poetry Society of America's Louise Louis/Emily F. Bourne Student Poetry Award is given "for the best unpublished poem by a student in grades 9 through 12 from the United States. The award is endowed under the will of Louise Louis Whitbread and Ruth M. Bourne. Each winner receives a $250 prize.

Winners
2018: Emily Tian, Judge: Jillian Weise
2017: Alex Bishop, Judge: Ari Banias
2016: Aidan Forster, Judge: Rebecca Gayle Howell
2015: Brynne Rebele-Henry, Judge: Aimee Nezhukumatathil
2014: Helen Galvin Ross, Judge: Richard Blanco
2013: Lizza Rodriguez, Judge: Gabrielle Calvocoressi
2012: Natalie Richardson, Judge: Dorothea Lasky
2011: Clara Fannjiang, Judge: Ada Limon
2010: Liya Person-Rechtman, Judge: Arda Collins
2009: Grace Dunham, Judge: Matthew Rohrer
2008: Carey Powers, Judge: David Roderick
2007: Laura Ruffino, Judge: Thomas Sayers Ellis
2006: Katherine Browning, Judge: Prageeta Sharma
2005: Paul Hendricks, Judge: Major Jackson
2004: Zachary Hertz, Judge: Brian Henry
2003: Hannah Jones, Judge: Brenda Shaugnessy
2002: Julia Friedlander, Judge: Timothy Liu
2001: Margaret Wohl
2000: Michael Ward, Judge: Elizabeth Alexander

Notes

See also
 Poetry Society of America
 List of American literary awards
 List of poetry awards
 List of years in poetry

External links
  Poetry Society of America main awards Web page

American poetry awards
Awards established in 2001